Soghomonyan or Soghomonian is an Armenian surname derived from Soghomon (Armenian: Սողոմոն), the Armenian equivalent of Solomon, and may refer to:
Eduard Soghomonyan (born 1990), Armenian-born Brazilian wrestler
Serob Soghomonyan (born 1986), Armenian artistic gymnast
Komitas (Soghomon Soghomonian, 1869–1935), Armenian priest, musicologist, composer, arranger, singer and choirmaster

Armenian-language surnames
Patronymic surnames
Surnames from given names